The 2020 BoyleSports World Grand Prix was a darts tournament and the 23rd staging of the World Grand Prix. It was held from 6–12 October 2020 at the Ricoh Arena in Coventry, England, behind closed doors. Due to the COVID-19 pandemic, the tournament was held away from the Citywest Hotel in Dublin for the first time since 2001.

Michael van Gerwen was the defending champion, after defeating Dave Chisnall 5–2 in the 2019 final, to win his second consecutive and fifth overall World Grand Prix title. However, he was eliminated in the quarter-finals, after losing 3–0 to Simon Whitlock of Australia.

Gerwyn Price went on to beat Dirk van Duijvenbode 5–2 in the final to win the tournament for the first time.

This event saw the most seeds knocked out in the first round in the history of the tournament, with 6 of the 8 seeds eliminated, leaving only Van Gerwen and Price to make it into the second round.

By reaching the final, van Duijvenbode became the first person (other than Phil Taylor and Rod Harrington in the inaugural tournament in 1998) to reach the final on his debut in the tournament.

Prize money
The prize fund remained at £450,000, with the winner's earnings being £110,000.

The following is the breakdown of the fund:

Qualification
The field of 32 players consists of the top 16 on the PDC Order of Merit and the top 16 non-qualified players from the ProTour Order of Merit as of 27 September 2020; the top eight players on the Order of Merit are seeded for the tournament.

Prior to the tournament, Adrian Lewis and Stephen Bunting tested positive for COVID-19 and withdrew. They were replaced by Simon Whitlock and Jeffrey de Zwaan respectively, the next-ranked players on the Orders of Merit that they had qualified from.

The qualified field is as follows:

PDC Order of Merit (1–16) (Top 8 seeded)
  Michael van Gerwen (quarter-finals)
  Peter Wright (first round)
  Gerwyn Price (champion)
  Michael Smith (first round)
  Rob Cross (first round)
  Nathan Aspinall (first round)
  Daryl Gurney (first round)
  James Wade (first round)
  Gary Anderson (quarter-finals)
  Dave Chisnall (semi-finals)
  Dimitri Van den Bergh (second round)
  Ian White (first round)
  Glen Durrant (first round)
  Krzysztof Ratajski (first round)
  Mensur Suljović (first round)
  Adrian Lewis (COVID-19)
  Simon Whitlock (semi-finals)

Pro Tour
  Devon Petersen (second round)
  Danny Noppert (second round)
  José de Sousa (first round)
  Brendan Dolan (first round)
  Joe Cullen (quarter-finals)
  Jonny Clayton (second round)
  Ryan Searle (first round)
  Jermaine Wattimena (first round)
  Gabriel Clemens (second round)
  Mervyn King (second round)
  Stephen Bunting (COVID-19)
  Ryan Joyce (second round)
  Jamie Hughes (first round)
  Dirk van Duijvenbode (runner-up)
  Chris Dobey (first round)
  Kim Huybrechts (second round)
  Jeffrey de Zwaan (quarter-finals)

Draw

References

External links
Tournament website

World Grand Prix (darts)
World Grand Prix
World Grand Prix (darts)
Sports competitions in Coventry
World Grand Prix